Henry Sidney "Harry" Smith,  (born 14 June 1928) is a British Egyptologist and academic, specialising in epigraphy and Egyptian archaeology. He held the Edwards Chair of Egyptology at University College London from 1970 to 1986. He had previously been a lecturer in Egyptology at the University of Cambridge, where he was also Budge Fellow in Egyptology at Christ's College, Cambridge.

Early life and education
Smith was born on 14 June 1928 to Sidney Smith, FBA, an Assyriologist and curator, and his wife Mary (nee Parker), an artist. He was educated at Merchant Taylors' School, Northwood, an all-boys private school. He went on to study classics and Egyptology at Christ's College, Cambridge, graduating with a Bachelor of Arts (BA) degree in 1953: as per tradition, his BA was later promoted to a Master of Arts (MA Cantab) degree. He then studied Demotic, a late Ancient Egyptian script, under Stephen Glanville. He was awarded a Doctor of Letters (DLit) degree by the University of London in 1987.

Academic career

From 1953 to 1953, Smith worked as an epigraphist on the Theban tombs, and was an assistant to W. B. Emery at his archaeological excavation at Saqqara. He was appointed a lecturer in Egyptology at the University of Cambridge in 1954, and was elected Budge Fellow in Egyptology at Christ's College, Cambridge the following year. He continued to assist at excavations in Egypt and Nubia, working at the Buhen fortress and Qasr Ibrim from 1959. In 1961, he directed the Egypt Exploration Society's archaeological survey of Egyptian Nubia.

In 1963, he moved to University College, London (UCL), where he had been appointed Reader in Egyptian Archaeology. He was additionally appointed an honorary curator of the Petrie Museum of Egyptian Archaeology, a position he held between 1963 and 1970. From 1964 to 1965, he once more directed the EES's Egyptian Nubian Survey. He was field director of the excavations at Saqqara's Sacred Animal Necropolis between 1964 and 1976. In 1970, he was appointed to the Edwards Chair of Egyptology and head of UCL's Department of Egyptology. He directed excavations at Saqqara and Memphis between 1970 and 1988. He stepped down from the chair in 1986 and as head of department in 1988. He was made Professor Emeritus of Egyptology by UCL in 1993, upon his retirement.

Personal life
In 1961, Smith married Hazel Flory Leeper. His wife predeceased him, dying in 1991.

Honours
In 1985, Smith was elected a Fellow of the British Academy (FBA), the United Kingdom's national academy for the humanities and social sciences.

Selected works

References

1928 births
Living people
British Egyptologists
Epigraphers
British archaeologists
Fellows of the British Academy
Fellows of Christ's College, Cambridge
Academics of University College London
People educated at Merchant Taylors' School, Northwood
Alumni of Christ's College, Cambridge
Alumni of the University of London